Clyde Alves is a Canadian dancer, actor and singer.  Alves appeared on Broadway in The Music Man in the Susan Stroman revival (2000) as Tommy Djilas, and was nominated for the Fred Astaire Award for Best Male Dancer.  He repeated his role in the ABC television special of The Music Man which aired in 2003.

He has also appeared on Broadway in Wicked, Hairspray, Oklahoma! as Jess (2002) and as Mike in the 2008-09 tour of A Chorus Line.  Alves also appeared in the Off-Broadway musical Boobs! The Musical  and Altar Boyz as Juan.  Alves was in the Tony winning revival of Anything Goes with Sutton Foster and Joel Grey. He most recently starred in the 2014 Broadway revival of On The Town.  He is married to Robyn Hurder.

Awards and nominations

References

External links

Playbill

Year of birth missing (living people)
Living people
People from Brampton
Canadian male musical theatre actors
Musicians from Brampton
Canadian male television actors